Gwanda State University is a state higher education institution that is in Gwanda, Zimbabwe. The university is temporarily at the former Epoch Mine in Gwanda whilst construction takes place. The main campus shall be on an  site in Gwanda, with a  farm at Filabusi.

Academics
The university has two faculties — Engineering and Agriculture — with a Faculty of Industrial Management to follow later.

Programs offered under the faculty of engineering (five years):
Beng (Hons) Metallurgical Engineering
Beng (Hons) Mining Engineering
Bachelor of Engineering (Hons) in Surveying and Geomatics Engineering

Programs offered in the faculty of agriculture (four years):
Bsc (Hons) Agriculture-Crop science
Bsc (Hons) Agriculture–Animal science

References

Universities and colleges in Zimbabwe
Gwanda
Buildings and structures in Matabeleland South Province
Education in Matabeleland South Province
Educational institutions established in 2012
2012 establishments in Zimbabwe